Twelve men's teams competed in basketball at the 1980 Summer Olympics.

The following players represented Australia:

 Danny Morseu
 Gordie McLeod
 Ian Davies
 Larry Sengstock
 Les Riddle
 Mel Dalgleish
 Michael Tucker
 Perry Crosswhite
 Peter Ali
 Phil Smyth
 Steve Breheny
 Peter Walsh

The following players represented Brazil:

 André
 Marcel
 Marcelo
 Carioquinha
 Oscar Schmidt
 Adilson
 Gilson
 José Carlos Saiani
 Marquinhos
 Cadum
 Wagner da Silva

The following players represented Cuba:

 Alejandro Ortiz
 Alejandro Urgellés
 Daniel Scott
 Generoso Márquez
 Jorge Moré Rojas
 Miguel Calderón
 Noangel Luaces
 Pedro Abreu
 Raúl Dubois
 Ruperto Herrera
 Tomás Herrera
 Félix Morales

The following players represented Czechoslovakia:

 Dušan Žáček
 Gustáv Hraška
 Jaroslav Skála
 Jiří Pospíšil
 Kamil Brabenec
 Pavol Bojanovský
 Peter Rajniak
 Stano Kropilák
 Vlastibor Klimeš
 Vlastimil Havlík
 Zdeněk Douša
 Zdeněk Kos

The following players represented India:

 Baldev Singh
 Ajmer Singh
 Parvez Diniar
 Dilip Gurumurthy
 Harbhajan Singh
 Jorawar Singh
 Amarnath Nagarajan
 Pramdiph Singh
 Paramjit Singh
 Radhey Shyam
 Hanuman Singh
 Tarlok Singh Sandhu

The following players represented Italy:

 Romeo Sacchetti
 Roberto Brunamonti
 Mike Sylvester
 Enrico Gilardi
 Fabrizio Della Fiori
 Marco Solfrini
 Marco Bonamico
 Dino Meneghin
 Renato Villalta
 Renzo Vecchiato
 Pierluigi Marzorati
 Pietro Generali

The following players represented Poland:

 Jerzy Bińkowski
 Leszek Doliński
 Krzysztof Fikiel
 Eugeniusz Kijewski
 Marcin Michalski
 Mieczysław Młynarski
 Ireneusz Mulak
 Zdzisław Myrda
 Ryszard Prostak
 Wojciech Rosiński
 Justyn Węglorz
 Dariusz Zelig

The following players represented Senegal:

 Bassirou Badji
 Yaya Cissokho
 Omar Dia
 Mamadou Diop
 Moustafa Diop
 Mathieu Faye
 Moussa M'Bengue
 Adramé Ndiaye
 Mandiaye Ndiaye
 Modou Sady Diagne
 Yamar Samb
 Modou Tall

The following players represented the Soviet Union:

 Stanislav Yeryomin
 Valery Miloserdov
 Sergei Tarakanov
 Oleksandr Salnykov
 Andrey Lopatov
 Nikolay Deryugin
 Sergei Belov
 Volodymyr Tkachenko
 Anatoly Myshkin
 Sergejus Jovaiša
 Alexander Belostenny
 Vladimir Zhigily

The following players represented Spain:

 Cándido Sibilio
 Fernando Romay
 Ignacio Solozábal
 José Luis Llorente
 Juan Manuel López
 José María Margall
 Juan Antonio Corbalán
 Juan de la Cruz
 Juan Antonio San Epifanio
 Luis Santillana
 Manuel Flores
 Wayne Brabender

The following players represented Sweden:

 Peter Andersson
 Jan Enjebo
 Sten Feldreich
 Peter Gunterberg
 Joon-Olof Karlsson
 Bernt Malion
 Thomas Nordgren
 Roland Rahm
 Åke Skyttevall
 Torbjörn Taxén
 Göran Unger
 Leif Yttergren

The following players represented Yugoslavia:

References

1980